Five whys (or 5 whys) is an iterative interrogative technique used to explore the cause-and-effect relationships underlying a particular problem. The primary goal of the technique is to determine the root cause of a defect or problem by repeating the question "Why?" five times. The answer to the fifth why should reveal the root cause of the problem.

The technique was described by Taiichi Ohno at Toyota Motor Corporation. Others at Toyota and elsewhere have criticized the five whys technique for various reasons (see ).

Example  
An example of a problem is: the vehicle will not start.
Why? – The battery is dead.
Why? – The alternator is not functioning.
Why? – The alternator belt has broken.
Why? – The alternator belt was well beyond its useful service life and not replaced.
Why? – The vehicle was not maintained according to the recommended service schedule. (A root cause)

The questioning for this example could be taken further to a sixth, seventh, or higher level, but five iterations of asking why is generally sufficient to get to a root cause. The key is to encourage the troubleshooter to avoid assumptions and logic traps and instead trace the chain of causality in direct increments from the effect through any layers of abstraction to a root cause that still has some connection to the original problem. In this example, the fifth "why" suggests a broken process or an alterable behavior, which is indicative of reaching the root-cause level.

The last answer points to a process. This is one of the most important aspects in the five why approach – the real root cause should point toward a process that is not working well or does not exist. Untrained facilitators will often observe that answers seem to point towards classical answers such as not enough time, not enough investments, or not enough resources. These answers may be true, but they are out of our control. Therefore, instead of asking why?, ask why did the process fail?

History 
The technique was originally developed by Sakichi Toyoda and was used within the Toyota Motor Corporation during the evolution of its manufacturing methodologies. It is a critical component of problem-solving training, delivered as part of the induction into the Toyota Production System. The architect of the Toyota Production System, Taiichi Ohno, described the five whys method as "the basis of Toyota's scientific approach by repeating why five times the nature of the problem as well as its solution becomes clear." The tool has seen widespread use beyond Toyota, and is now used within Kaizen, lean manufacturing, lean construction and Six Sigma. The five whys were initially developed to understand why new product features or manufacturing techniques were needed, and was not developed for root cause analysis.

In other companies, it appears in other forms. Under Ricardo Semler, Semco practices "three whys" and broadens the practice to cover goal setting and decision-making.

Techniques 
Two primary techniques are used to perform a five whys analysis: the fishbone (or Ishikawa) diagram and a tabular format.

These tools allow for analysis to be branched in order to provide multiple root causes.

Criticism 

The five whys have been criticized as a poor tool for root cause analysis. Teruyuki Minoura, former managing director of global purchasing for Toyota, criticized them as being too basic a tool to analyze root causes to the depth that is needed to ensure that they are fixed. Reasons for this criticism include:

 Tendency for investigators to stop at symptoms rather than going on to lower-level root causes.
 Inability to go beyond the investigator's current knowledge – the investigator cannot find causes that they do not already know.
 Lack of support to help the investigator provide the right answer to "why" questions.
 Results are not repeatable – different people using five whys come up with different causes for the same problem.
 Tendency to isolate a single root cause, whereas each question could elicit many different root causes.

Medical professor Alan J. Card also criticized the five whys as a poor root cause analysis tool and suggested that it be abandoned entirely. His reasoning also includes:

 The artificial depth of the fifth why is unlikely to correlate with the root cause.
 The five whys is based on a misguided reuse of a strategy to understand why new features should be added to products, not a root cause analysis.

To avoid these issues, Card suggested abandoning the five whys and instead use other root cause analysis tools such as fishbone or lovebug diagrams.

See also

 Eight disciplines problem solving
 Five Ws (information-gathering)
 Four causes
 Issue map
 Issue tree
 Root cause analysis
 Socratic method
 Why–because analysis

References

External links
 "Dauerspezial" commercial of Deutsche Bahn, where the question "why" is posed 5 times (in German)

Problem solving methods
Lean manufacturing